This list of bridges in Montenegro lists bridges of particular historical, scenic, architectural or engineering interest. Road and railway bridges, viaducts, aqueducts and footbridges are included.

Historical and architectural interest bridges

Major road and railway bridges 
This table presents the structures with spans greater than 100 meters (non-exhaustive list).

Notes and references 
 

 Others references

See also 

 Transport in Montenegro
 Highways in Montenegro
 Rail transport in Montenegro
 Geography of Montenegro

External links 

 
 
 

Montenegro
 
Bridges
Bridges